Andrea Tafi may refer to:

Andrea Tafi (artist) (active 1300–1325)
Andrea Tafi (cyclist) (born 1966)